Mbacké is a Senegalese surname that may refer to
Serigne Saliou Mbacké (1915–2007), Grand Marabout (leader) of the Mouride movement in Senegal 
Serigne Mouhamadou Lamine Bara Mbacké (c.1925–2010), Grand Marabout of the Mouride movement in Senegal

Serigne Abdou Lahi Mbacké "Yallaye Bour"
Spiritual leader of Mbacke-Baol /  The Family of Borom Sam